"Ori, ori" (trans. Plow, plow) is the B-side of the second single by the Serbian punk rock band Pekinška Patka.

Track listing 
Both tracks by Nebojša Čonkić and Sreten Kovačević.
 "Bolje da nosim kratku kosu" (2:30)
 "Ori, ori" (1:56)

Cover versions 
 Serbian punk rock band Atheist Rap recorded a cover version of the song as a part of the Pekinška Patka cover versions mix entitled "Plitka poezija".

References 
  The single at Discogs
 EX YU ROCK enciklopedija 1960–2006, Janjatović Petar; 

1980 songs